A classical approach to solve the Hypergraph bipartitioning problem is an iterative heuristic by Charles Fiduccia and Robert Mattheyses. This heuristic is commonly called the FM algorithm.

Introduction 
FM algorithm is a linear time heuristic for improving network partitions.
New features to K-L heuristic:
 Aims at reducing net-cut costs; the concept of cutsize is extended to hypergraphs.
 Vertices are weighted.
 Can handle "unbalanced" partitions; a balance factor is introduced.
 A special data structure is used to select vertices to be moved across the cut to improve running time.
 Time complexity O(P), where P is the total # of terminals.

F–M heuristic: notation 
Input: A hypergraph with a vertex (cell) set and a hyperedge (net) set
 n(i): # of cells in Net i; e.g., n(1) = 4
 s(i): size of Cell i
 p(i): # of pins of Cell i; e.g., p(1) = 4
 C: total # of cells; e.g., C = 13
 N: total # of nets; e.g., N = 4
 P: total # of pins; P = p(1) + … + p(C) = n(1) + … + n(N)
 Area ratio r, 0< r<1

Output: 2 partitions 
 Cutsetsize is minimized
 |A|/(|A|+|B|) ≈ r

See also
 Graph partition
 Kernighan–Lin algorithm

References

Electronic design automation